Maidenform Brands is a manufacturer of women's underwear, founded in 1922 by seamstress Ida Rosenthal; Enid Bissett, who owned the shop that employed her; and Ida's husband, William Rosenthal. They rebelled against the flat-chested designs of the time and instead produced both dresses and support undergarments, particularly bras that accentuated the natural shape of a woman's figure, hence the name Maidenform.

History
The company was founded in Bayonne, New Jersey. After going through a long restructuring effort at the end of the 1990s and early 2000s, Maidenform became a publicly traded company in July, 2005. Maidenform became a top leading shapewear brand taking over 40% of market share. This is #1 shapewear brand among other shapewear brands in America. Now Maidenform has about 8,000 stores in the US including Sears, Macy's and JCP Penney. Also, it has more than 75 stores all over the world. For example, Debenhams and House of Fraser in Europe and Sogo, Takashimaya in Asia. Sold to Hanesbrands in 2013.

Pigeon bras

"When Maidenform converted factories to assist the U.S. military during World War II, the bra brand manufactured two things: parachutes and pigeon bras. Or, as they are known in polite society, pigeon vests, made out of bra-like materials and designed for paratroopers to strap to their chests. (Seen above, or on a paratrooper here.) After landing in a war zone, the paratrooper would undo his pigeon's bra, load the bird with a message, and send it back to home base."

Notable advertising
An imaginary situation of a partially undressed dream was exploited in Maidenform's advertising in the 1950s and 1960s - "I dreamed I...[doing some ordinary activity]... in my Maidenform bra.", with an illustration of the person wearing only underwear in a public place, appearing proud and cheerful. This campaign was referenced in a season 2 episode of Mad Men, in which competitor Playtex, who (fictionally) has an account with the Sterling Cooper ad agency, asks Sterling Cooper to change their older-style ads to one more similar to Maidenform's.

In reality, this very successful advertising campaign was originated by Harry Trenner and his wife Florence Shapiro Trenner.   Harry Trenner was, at that time, working for the William Weintrob Advertising Agency in New York City, and Maidenform was one of his accounts.  They both would tell the story that they were sitting around the kitchen table after dinner in their home in the Wykagyl Park section of New Rochelle, New York.  They hit on the idea for the ad and Harry took it to the agency which expanded it and showed it to Maidenform.

Today
In October 2007, the company's headquarters moved to a new location in Iselin, New Jersey.   
In November 2009, real estate developer Doug Stern acquired the property and with partner CSR Group, began the redevelopment of the former Maidenform Factory into SilkLofts, a residential building comprising 85 luxury loft rental apartments, including six artist's lofts.  In 2010, the site was approved as a historic preservation project by the National Park Service.  The conversion consists of restoring and incorporating existing brick and heavy timbers made of long leaf yellow pine into the new residential spaces, restoring and opening up original brick archways to bring the building back to its historical look, and reusing brick and wood salvaged during construction to build walls and floors.   Designed to achieve LEED Silver certification (Leadership in Environmental and Energy Design) from the U.S. Green Building Council, SilkLofts includes environmentally-conscious elements such as Bamboo flooring, new Argon gas-filled factory windows, energy-efficient appliances, and Quartz countertops made from recycled materials.  Most of the conversion was completed by early 2014, with the first residents expected to move in May, 2014.

References

External links
 Official website
 Collection of mid-twentieth century advertising featuring Maidenform lingerie from The TJS Labs Gallery of Graphic Design.

Companies formerly listed on the New York Stock Exchange
Lingerie brands
Clothing companies of the United States
Companies based in Hudson County, New Jersey
Companies that filed for Chapter 11 bankruptcy in 1997
Clothing companies established in 1922
Bayonne, New Jersey
Woodbridge Township, New Jersey
1922 establishments in New Jersey